The Man Who Captured Eichmann is a 1996 American historical drama television film directed by William Graham and written by Lionel Chetwynd, based on the 1990 book Eichmann in My Hands by Peter Malkin and Harry Stein. The film stars Robert Duvall as Nazi war criminal Adolf Eichmann, who lived under the name Ricardo Klement in Buenos Aires, Argentina, and Arliss Howard as Israeli Mossad agent Peter Malkin, who captured Eichmann in 1960.

The Man Who Captured Eichmann premiered on TNT on November 10, 1996. The film received positive reviews from critics, with Duvall being nominated for a Primetime Emmy Award and a Screen Actors Guild Award for his performance.

Plot
Set in 1960, the story follows the efforts of the Mossad, the Israeli Secret Service, to find former SS Colonel Adolf Eichmann, who fled Germany for Argentina and took the name Ricardo Klement. He was wanted for the mass murder of both Jews and non-Jews in Europe during the Holocaust. Learning of Eichmann's living in Argentina, the Mossad sends a team to capture him, led by agent Peter Malkin. The standing order is to bring Eichmann back alive to Israel for trial.

The film ends with the take-off of the El Al aircraft taking Eichmann to face trial in Jerusalem.

Cast

Robert Duvall as Adolf Eichmann/Ricardo Klement
Arliss Howard as Peter Malkin
Jeffrey Tambor as Isser Harel
Jack Laufer as Uzi
Nicolas Surovy as Hans
Joel Brooks as Meir
Michael Laskin as Dr. Klein
Sam Robards as David
Michael Tucci as Danny
Rusty Schwimmer as Rosa
Jean Pierre Reguerraz as Laszlo Ungari
Celina Font as Angela Ungari
Erika Wallner as Catalina Klement 
Kevin Schiele as Nicolas Klement
Gregory Dayton as Muller
Marcelo Sycz as Dieter Klement
Brian Hussey as Hasse Klement
Marcos Woinsky as Abba Eban

Release
The film premiered on TNT on November 10, 1996. It was released on VHS and DVD by Warner Home Video.

Awards and nominations

References

External links
 
 

1996 films
1996 drama films
1996 television films
1990s historical drama films
1990s psychological drama films
American historical drama films
American psychological drama films
Cultural depictions of Adolf Eichmann
American drama television films
1990s English-language films
Films about the capture of Adolf Eichmann
Films based on non-fiction books
Films directed by William Graham (director)
Films scored by Laurence Rosenthal
Films set in 1960
Films set in Buenos Aires
Films shot in Buenos Aires
Historical television films
Television films based on books
TNT Network original films
1990s American films